Ahmed Radhi Humaiesh Al-Salehi, (21 April 1964 – 21 June 2020) was an Iraqi footballer who played as a forward.

Regarded as one of Iraq and Asia's best players of all-time, Radhi scored the only Iraqi goal in the FIFA World Cup during its 1986 edition, a low shot to the corner of the net against Belgium in a 2–1 defeat. He was voted as the Asian Footballer of the Year in 1988.

Club career
Radhi started to make a name for himself after he was forced to switch childhood club Al-Zawraa for new powerhouse Al-Rasheed, the club founded and owned by Saddam Hussein's eldest son Uday. Alongside fellow legend Adnan Dirjal, Radhi led the club to reaching the 1988–89 Asian Club Championship final, losing to Qatari side Al Sadd on away goals. He later had a four-year spell at Al-Wakrah in Qatar before finishing his career with Al-Zawraa.

International career
Radhi was given his debut for Iraq against Jordan on 21 February 1982 by Ammo Baba, who acknowledged his talent and supported the player in his first years of senior football. Coach Baba however left Radhi out of the 1984 Summer Olympics squad citing a lack of effort by the player. He then scored 8 goals in World Cup qualification, leading Iraq to a first World Cup finals, in Mexico in 1986.

With Iraq he won 2 Arab Cups, 1 Pan-Arab Games & a Gulf Cup, while he also did represent Iraq in the Olympics in 1988, scoring a goal each in games against Zambia and Guatemala. In 1988, he was voted Asian player of the year and 9th best Asian player of the century in 1999.

Personal life
Radhi had three daughters and one son.

He fled Iraq in 2006 because of the sectarian violence and moved with his family to the Jordanian capital Amman, but returned to Iraq in 2007 for a career in politics. In October 2007, he was nominated by the opposition Iraqi Accord Front to the Council of Representatives of Iraq, replacing Abd al-Nasir al-Janabi, who had resigned to join the insurgency.

He was an unsuccessful candidate in the 2014 and 2018 elections with the National Alliance, a coalition of Sunni and Shia figures.

Death
Radhi was admitted into Al Nuaman General Hospital in Adhamiyah on 13 June 2020 after contracting COVID-19. He left the hospital only to be readmitted on 18 June after his condition worsened. On 21 June, Radhi was pronounced dead at the age of 56 following complications from COVID-19 during the COVID-19 pandemic in Iraq.

Details about his death were later revealed, that he was about to be taken to be treated in Jordan, but delays in finalizing his medical report postponed the proposed flight. However, the death happened after Radhi removed his artificial ventilation to go to the restroom by himself, later on the medical staff found him dead. His resting place is the Karkh Cemetery in Abu Ghraib.

Career statistics

International goals
Scores and results list Iraq's goal tally first.

Honours

Player
Al-Rasheed
 Iraqi Premier League: 1986–87, 1987–88, 1988–89
 Iraq FA Cup: 1986–87, 1987–88
 Arab Club Champions Cup: 1985, 1986, 1987

Al-Zawraa
 Iraqi Premier League: 1990–91, 1998–99
 Iraq FA Cup: 1990–91, 1992–93, 1997–98, 1998–99
 Iraqi Elite Cup: 1991

Iraq
 Asian Games: 1982
 Arabian Gulf Cup: 1984, 1988
 Pan Arab Games: 1985
 Arab Cup: 1988

Individual
 Asian Footballer of the Year: 1988
 Arabian Gulf Cup top scorer: 1988
 Arab Cup top scorer: 1988
 Iraqi Premier League top scorer: 1985–86, 1991–92
 Chosen in the Asia's Top 10 Players of the Century list by IFFHS.

Manager
Al-Shorta
 Iraqi Elite Cup: 2000

See also
List of men's footballers with 100 or more international caps
List of men's footballers with 50 or more international goals

References

External links
 
 
Ahmed Radhi at https://www.ahmedradhi.com

1964 births
2020 deaths
Sportspeople from Baghdad
Association football forwards
Iraqi footballers
Olympic footballers of Iraq
Iraq international footballers
FIFA Century Club
Footballers at the 1982 Asian Games
Footballers at the 1986 Asian Games
Asian Games medalists in football
Asian Games gold medalists for Iraq
Medalists at the 1982 Asian Games
1986 FIFA World Cup players
Footballers at the 1988 Summer Olympics
Al-Zawraa SC players
Al-Rasheed players
Al-Wakrah SC players
Iraqi Premier League players
Qatar Stars League players
Iraqi expatriate footballers
Expatriate footballers in Qatar
Iraqi expatriate sportspeople in Qatar
Asian Footballer of the Year winners
Iraqi football managers
Al-Shorta SC managers
Al-Quwa Al-Jawiya managers
Al-Zawraa SC managers
Iraqi Accord Front politicians
Iraqi sportsperson-politicians
Deaths from the COVID-19 pandemic in Iraq
Iraqi expatriate sportspeople in the United Arab Emirates
Expatriate footballers in the United Arab Emirates